The Patna Pride March, held in Patna, India, is a civil rights march for lesbian, gay, bisexual, transgender, and queer (LGBTQ) people to build communities and socialize. There have been three iterations of the march over a period of seven years.

2012 Pride March 
In 2012, the city of Patna saw a Pride March on 29 March. This was a small  procession, starting at the historic Gandhi Maidan and concluded at the busy Dak Bunglow Chowk.

This March was organised by Project Pehchaan  and a local Patna group called Dostana Safar. It was a small event with just 20 attending participants.

Patna University also had previously organised a session on Queer Literature at a refresher course for English Lecturers.

2017 Pride March 
In 2017, the Pride March was repeated when members walked on Beer Chand Patel Marg, from R-Block to Miller High School. The group then stood outside Miller High School holding placards and a banner.

The 2017 march was held to demand respect and create sensibility towards the community and also demand for equal rights. The regional manager of the VHS (Voluntary Health Services) Girish Kumar said that the charter of the demands will be sent to the chief minister Mr. Nitish Kumar.

2019 Pride March 
To mark International Non-binary Peoples Day, the 2019 Patna Pride March took place 14 July 2019. The centerpiece of the march was the world’s largest transgender flag, although only a few feet wide, it was long with over 500 people carrying it the parade route. They went from the historic Hindi Sahitya Samelan to Rajendra Nagar’s Prem Chandra Rangshala, the path of which covers 1.8 kilometers of city.

References 

Pride parades in India
Culture of Patna
2012 establishments in Bihar
Recurring events established in 2012